The 2017 Sultan Azlan Shah Cup was the 26th edition of the Sultan Azlan Shah Cup. It was held in Ipoh, Perak, Malaysia from 29 April – 6 May 2017.

The number of teams for this year’s cup has decreased by one compared to last year’s tournament where seven teams competed. Pakistan and Canada, who competed previously, will not join this edition and Great Britain had been invited.

Great Britain defeated Australia 4–3 in the final to win the cup.

Participating nations
Six countries are participating in this year's tournament:

 (Host)

Umpires

 Sean Rapaport (RSA)
 Napoleon Chanamthabam (IND)
 Shigeki Kodama (JPN)
 Eric Koh Kim Lai (MAS)
 Nichol Bevan (NZL)
 Steve Rogers (AUS)
 Paul Walker (GBR)
 Bruce Bale (ENG) - Video Umpire

Squads

Results
All times are in Malaysia Standard Time (UTC+08:00).

Pool

Classification

Fifth and sixth place

Third and fourth place

Final

Goalscorers

Awards
Five awards were awarded during the tournament, they were:
Fairplay: 
Best Player:  Tom Craig
Man of the Match (Final):  Alan Forsyth
Best Goalkeeper:  Suguru Shimmoto
Top Scorer:  Tom Craig,  Trent Mitton,  Mandeep Singh (5 goals)

Final standings

References

External links
Official website

2017
2017 in field hockey
2017 in Malaysian sport
2017 in Australian field hockey
2017 in British sport
2017 in New Zealand sport 
2017 in Indian sport
2017 in Japanese sport
April 2017 sports events in Asia
May 2017 sports events in Asia